Anders Bertil Pålsson (born 12 April 1958) is a Swedish businessman who is currently the chairman of the Swedish Association football club Malmö FF, a post he has held since 2018 when he became acting chairman after the death of Håkan Jeppsson. On 1 March 2019, Pålsson was confirmed by the annual general meeting as the club's full-term chairman.

References 

1958 births
Swedish sports executives and administrators
Malmö FF players
Malmö FF chairmen
Lund University alumni
Association footballers not categorized by position
Swedish footballers
Living people